Spirit blue or Opal blue SS is a dye with formula  C37H30ClN3. It is used as an indicator in agar for detection of lipase activity in bacteria.

References

Chlorides
Triarylmethane dyes